is a Japanese footballer currently playing as a forward for Machida Zelvia.

Career statistics

Club
.

Notes

References

External links

2001 births
Living people
Sportspeople from Sendai
Association football people from Miyagi Prefecture
Japanese footballers
Japan youth international footballers
Association football forwards
J2 League players
FC Machida Zelvia players